Lamar DeShawn Batista (born March 7, 1998) is an American soccer player who currently plays for San Antonio FC in USL Championship.

Career

College
Batista spent one season playing college soccer at the UC Santa Barbara in 2016.

Professional
Batista signed with the United Soccer League side Portland Timbers 2 in March 2017.

On February 21, 2019, Batista signed with Los Angeles FC in Major League Soccer. He spent the majority of the 2019 on loan at Phoenix Rising FC in the USL Championship and FC Tucson in USL League One.

After one season with North Texas SC, Batista joined USL Championship side Colorado Springs Switchbacks FC ahead of the 2021 season. On August 6, 2021, Batista moved on loan to fellow USL Championship side OKC Energy for the remainder of the season.

On January 31, 2022, Batista became the second player to sign with Rochester New York FC ahead of their inaugural season in MLS Next Pro.

References

External links

1998 births
Living people
African-American soccer players
American soccer players
Association football defenders
Portland Timbers 2 players
Soccer players from Oklahoma
Sportspeople from Oklahoma City
UC Santa Barbara Gauchos men's soccer players
USL Championship players
Portland Timbers players
Los Angeles FC players
Phoenix Rising FC players
North Texas SC players
USL League One players
Colorado Springs Switchbacks FC players
OKC Energy FC players
San Antonio FC players
21st-century African-American sportspeople
MLS Next Pro players